Straight Up Paula! was the second headlining concert tour by American singer Paula Abdul. The tour marks the singer's first headlining tour in 27 years, since her 1991–92 Under My Spell Tour. The tour played 25 concerts throughout North America.

Background
On July 9, 2018, it was announced that Abdul would go on tour to celebrate the 30th anniversary of her debut album, Forever Your Girl (1988). Ticket sales started four days after the announcement. The singer said that "It's been decades since I've done my own tour, but I had a great taste of what it's like being on the road last summer with the New Kids on the Block and Boyz II Men, and had a great time. It was just a real warm welcome and [it reminded me] of how it felt like when I was on the road constantly years and years ago".

Critical reception
The tour received positive reviews throughout its run. Debra L. Rothenburg of Infocus Visions gave a positive review of the Staten Island show stating “Ms. Abdul at age 56 is a bundle of energy and she sings and dances and owns the stage the same as she did over 25 years ago.” Shaun Astor of Tahoe Onstage gave a positive review of the Reno show stating “Paula did exactly what she explained she had done throughout her career: persevered. And when it was all over, she stepped out of the spotlight and left a room full of people with ecstatic smiles on their faces.” Eileen Shapiro of Get Out gave a positive review of the show in Englewood, stating “The visual cascade was extraordinary, sequentially fascinating and vibrant.”

Incidents 
During the Biloxi show, while performing "The Promise of a New Day," Abdul fell head first off the stage.

Setlist
This set list is from the concert on November 25, 2018, in Lynn. It is not intended to represent all shows from the tour.
"(It's Just) The Way That You Love Me"
"Knocked Out"
"Singin’ in the Rain" 
"Opposites Attract"
"Cold Hearted"
"Rush Rush" 
"Blowing Kisses in the Wind"
"The Promise of a New Day"
"Crazy Cool"
"Straight Up"
"Forever Your Girl"

Shows

Cancelled shows

References

Paula Abdul concert tours
2018 concert tours